Stone Ridge may mean:

Stone Ridge, New York
Stone Ridge, Virginia
Stone Ridge (Antarctica)

See also
Stone Ridge School of the Sacred Heart, Bethesda, Maryland
Stoneridge Investment Partners v. Scientific-Atlanta
Stoneridge Shopping Center, Pleasanton, California
The Stoneridge Group